Omoglymmius hesperus is a species of beetle in the subfamily Rhysodidae. It was described by Ross Bell and Joyce Bell in 1982.

References

hesperus
Beetles described in 1982